Aqaseyyed Yaqub (also Romanized as Āqāseyyed Yaʿqūb) is a village in Molla Sara Rural District, in the Central District of Shaft County, Gilan Province, Iran. At the 2006 census, its population was 1,119, in 297 families.

References 

Populated places in Shaft County